Berganza is a surname. Notable people with the surname include:

Eddie Berganza, American comics writer and editor
Francisco de Berganza (1663–1738), Spanish Benedictine monk and medievalist
Francisco Xavier Berganza (born 1967), Mexican politician
Paloma Berganza, Spanish singer
Teresa Berganza (1933–2022), Spanish opera singer